The Capela dos Ossos is an ossuary chapel in Faro, Portugal, which belongs to the 18th century Carmelite church Nossa Senhora do Carmo.

Above the entrance, there is the following inscription:

Pára aqui a considerar que a este estado hás-de chegar

which translates to

Stop here and consider, that you will reach this state too.

The 4 by 6 meter sized chapel is built of the bones of more than 1000 Carmelite friars and has been inaugurated in 1816. It is situated behind the main church and contains also 1245 skulls.

See also

 Capela dos Ossos in Évora, the more famous chapel of bones

External links 

Ossuaries
Roman Catholic chapels in Portugal
Buildings and structures in Faro, Portugal